Honig is a surname of German, Dutch and Ashkenazi Jewish origin. The word means honey in German. People with the name include:

 Adriaan Honig or Honich (1643–1684), Dutch landscape painter
 Antonín Honig, Czech cyclist who participated in the 1928 Olympics
 Barry H. Honig (born 1941), American professor of computational biochemistry and molecular biophysics
 Bonnie Honig (born 1959), American political and legal theorist and feminist
 Dick Honig (born c. 1940), American official in American football
 Donald Honig (born 1931), American writer, baseball historian
 Edwin Honig (1919–2011), American writer, translator
 Elie Honig, American attorney
 Eugen Honig (1873–1945), German architect
 Ezekiel Honig (born 1977), American musician, manager
 Helen Honig (1907–2003), American publisher
 Joel Honig (1936–2003), American music critic, writer, pianist
 Lucy Honig (born 1948), American short story writer
 Michael Honig (born 1955), American university professor in electronics
 Peregrine Honig (born 1976), American artist
 Rachael A. Honig, American attorney
 Rebecca Honig a.k.a. Rebecca Handler (contemporary), American voice actress
 Reinier Honig (born 1983), Dutch racing cyclist
 Richard Honig (1890–1981), German professor for jurisprudence
 Sarah Honig (b. 1940s), Israeli-born journalist, author
 Sebastian F. Honig (born 1978), German astronomer
 Wolfgang Honig (born 1954), German athlete in rowing

See also
 Hönig

German-language surnames
Jewish surnames